Zacalantica galathea is a species of sea snail, a marine gastropod mollusk in the family Phenacolepadidae.

Description
The length of the shell attains 10.9 mm.

Distribution
This marine species occurs off Tanzania, the Comoros and Fiji Islands.

References

External links
 [httpsLamarck (J.-B. M.) de. (1819). Histoire naturelle des animaux sans vertèbres. Tome 6(1): vi + 343 pp. Paris: published by the author. ]://www.biodiversitylibrary.org/item/47441
 Adams H. & Adams A. (1853–1858). The genera of Recent Mollusca; arranged according to their organization. London, van Voorst. Vol. 1: xl + 484 pp.; vol. 2: 661 pp.; vol. 3: 138 pls. [Published in parts: Vol. 1: i-xl (1858), 1–256 (1853), 257–484 (1854). Vol. 2: 1–92 (1854), 93–284 (1855), 285–412 (1856), 413–540 (1857), 541–661 (1858). Vol. 3: pl. 1–32 (1853), 33–96 (1855), 97–112 (1856), 113–128 (1857), 129–138 (1858)
 Fukumori H., Yahagi T., Warén A. & Kano Y. (2019). Amended generic classification of the marine gastropod family Phenacolepadidae: transitions from snails to limpets and shallow-water to deep-sea hydrothermal vents and cold seeps. Zoological Journal of the Linnean Society. 185(3): 636-655.

Phenacolepadidae
Gastropods described in 1858